The Crime of Tove Andersen (Danish: Kriminalsagen Tove Andersen) is a 1953 Danish crime film directed by Sven Methling and starring Preben Lerdorff Rye, Ib Schønberg and Else Jarlbak.

Cast 
 Preben Lerdorff Rye as Kriminalbetjent Knudsen
 Ib Schønberg as Kriminalbetjent Villumsen
 Else Jarlbak as Fru Villumsen
 Aage Winther-Jørgensen as Kriminalassistent
 Arthur Jensen as Sprit Ole
 Ove Sprogøe as Mælkemand Valde
 Karl Stegger as Værtshusholder
 Emil Hass Christensen as Apoteker
 Ellen Gottschalch as Portnerske Martha Christoffersen
 Svend Methling as Læge Ove Kampstrup
  as Tove Andersen
 Preben Neergaard as Robert Koldberg
 Karen Berg as Fru Burdal
 Vera Gebuhr as Fru Burdals ældste datter
 Carl Ottosen as Bartender Olsen
 Jakob Nielsen as Hr. Andersen
 Ib Fürst
 Ernst Schou
 Adelhaid Nielsen as Toves mor
 Inga Thessen
 Kirsten Aller
 Tove Bang
 Berit Erbe
 Poul Jensen
  as Tove Andersens kusine
 Ebbe Langberg as Lærling

References

Bibliography 
 Tad Bentley Hammer. International film prizes: an encyclopedia. Garland, 1991.

External links 
 

1953 crime films
1953 films
Danish black-and-white films
Danish crime films
1950s Danish-language films
Films directed by Sven Methling